L'épreuve de l'étranger. Culture et traduction dans l'Allemagne romantique: Herder, Goethe, Schlegel, Novalis, Humboldt, Schleiermacher, Hölderlin. is a book by Antoine Berman, published in 1984.

The work has been very influential among intellectuals. On their book Traduire Freud, André Bourguignon, Pierre Cotet, Jean Laplanche and François Robert, when giving scientific and technical advice regarding translation, they mention Berman's book; they consider that, during the age of Romanticism, German literary scholars such as Herder, Goethe, Schlegel, Novalis, Hölderlin, Humboldt and Schleiermacher give light to the "German theory" in translation, consciously opposed to "French-style" translations.

This book was translated into English by Stefan Heyvaert with the title The Experience of the Foreign: Culture and Translation in Romantic Germany. Albany: SUNY Press, 1992.

References

1984 non-fiction books
Translation studies
Translation publications
French-language books
Romanticism
SUNY Press books